"Slap That Bass" is a song composed by George Gershwin, with lyrics by Ira Gershwin, introduced by Fred Astaire and Dudley Dickerson in the 1937 film Shall We Dance.

The song refers to the slap style of double bass playing that was popular at the time.

Notable recordings
Uri Caine, on album Rhapsody in Blue (2013)
Georgia Brown - Georgia Brown Sings Gershwin/Georgia Brown (2003)
Ella Fitzgerald - Ella Fitzgerald Sings the George and Ira Gershwin Songbook (1959)
Susannah McCorkle - How Do You Keep the Music Playing (1985)
Chris Connor - Chris Connor Sings the George Gershwin Almanac of Song (1957)

Notes and references 

Songs with music by George Gershwin
Songs with lyrics by Ira Gershwin
Fred Astaire songs
1937 songs